Gregg Lowe is a British actor born in 1986.

Lowe is from Gorleston-On-Sea, Norfolk, and was educated at Cliff Park High School.

In 2015, Lowe collapsed at the finish line after running the Toronto Marathon, he was dead for 3 minutes before being revived by student paramedics.

Lowe is an ambassador for the Ocean conservation society Sea Shepherd and in 2015 he was part of the campaign Operation Milagro.

Filmography

Film

Television

Video games

References

External links

Living people
Year of birth missing (living people)
British male film actors
British television actors
British video game actors
British voice actors
People from Gorleston-on-Sea
Actors from Norfolk
21st-century British male actors